The Harbin-Qiqihar Through Train (Chinese:哈尔滨到齐齐哈尔动车组列车) is Chinese railway running between the capital Harbin to Qiqihar express passenger trains by the Harbin Railway Bureau, Harbin passenger segment responsible for passenger transport task, Harbin originating on the Qiqihar train. CRH5 Type Passenger trains running along the Harbin–Qiqihar Intercity Railway across Heilongjiang provinces, the entire 288 km.

Train trips 
D6901: Harbin West - Qiqihar South
D6902: Qiqihar South - Harbin West
D6903: Harbin - Qiqihar South
D6904: Qiqihar South - Harbin West
D6905: Harbin West - Qiqihar
D6906: Qiqihar - Harbin
D6907: Harbin - Qiqihar
D6908: Qiqihar - Harbin West
D7901: Harbin - Qiqihar
D7902: Qiqihar - Harbin West
D7903: Harbin - Qiqihar
D7904: Qiqihar - Harbin West
D7931: Harbin West - Qiqihar South
D7932: Qiqihar South - Harbin
D7933: Harbin West - Qiqihar South
D7934: Qiqihar South - Harbin West
D7935: Harbin West - Qiqihar
D7936: Qiqihar South - Harbin West
D7937: Harbin - Qiqihar South
D7938: Qiqihar South - Harbin
D7939: Harbin - Qiqihar South
D7940: Qiqihar - Harbin
D7941: Harbin - Qiqihar South
D7942: Qiqihar South - Harbin West
D7943: Harbin West - Qiqihar South
D7944: Qiqihar South - Harbin
D7945: Harbin - Qiqihar South
D7946: Qiqihar South - Harbin
D7947: Harbin West - Qiqihar South
D7948: Qiqihar South - Harbin
D7949: Harbin West - Qiqihar South
D7950: Qiqihar South - Harbin
D7951: Harbin West - Qiqihar South
D7952: Qiqihar South - Harbin West
D7953: Harbin - Qiqihar South
D7954: Qiqihar South - Harbin
D7955: Harbin - Qiqihar South
D7956: Qiqihar South - Harbin
D7957: Harbin - Qiqihar South
D7958: Qiqihar South - Harbin
D7959: Harbin - Qiqihar South
D7960: Qiqihar South - Harbin West
D7961: Harbin West - Qiqihar South
D7962: Qiqihar South - Harbin West
D7963: Harbin West - Qiqihar South
D7964: Qiqihar South - Harbin West
D7965: Harbin - Qiqihar South
D7966: Qiqihar South - Harbin West

See also 
K7015/7016 Harbin-Qiqihar Through Train

References 

D
Rail transport in Heilongjiang